Farafina is a music and dance group from Burkina Faso, established in 1978. The eight-member group is Burkina Faso's best known musical group, and one of Africa's most internationally prominent musical groups.

History 

The group was founded in the southern city of Bobo Dioulasso by the balafon player, Mahama Konaté, a member of the Senufo ethnic group and a performer with Burkina Faso's national ballet. The group mainly uses voices and instruments including the balafon, kora, djembe, bara, tama, [doum'doum), shekere, and keyboard.

The group toured internationally in Europe, Canada, and the United States. In 1985, they played at the Montreux Jazz Festival, and in 1988 performed for thousands at the birthday party of Nelson Mandela in Wembley Stadium, London. In 1993 they toured the United States and Canada. They were one of the groups which played in 1999 during the celebration of the 10th anniversary of the House of World Cultures in Berlin. Later that year, the group played at the Womad Festival in Singapore.

They have collaborated and recorded with Ryuichi Sakamoto, Jon Hassell, and The Rolling Stones.

Discography
1985 - Farafina Live at Montreux Jazz Festival
1989 - Bolomakote
1993 - Faso Denou
1998 - Nemako
2001 - Kanou
2012 - Denti Fere

With Ryuichi Sakamoto
1989 - Beauty (three tracks)

With The Rolling Stones
1989 - Steel Wheels (on the track "Continental Drift")

With Jon Hassell
1988 - Flash of the Spirit

References

External links
Official website

Musical groups established in 1978
Burkinabé music